River city is the generic name used to describe any city located on a river.

River City may also refer to:

City nickname

Australia 
 Brisbane, Queensland

Canada 
 Campbell River, British Columbia

China 
 Jilin City
 Wuhan

New Zealand 
 Whanganui

United States 
 Decatur, Alabama
 Cape Girardeau, Missouri
 Chattanooga, Tennessee
 Danville, Virginia
 Evansville, Indiana
 Grand Rapids, Michigan
 Huntington, West Virginia
 Jacksonville, Florida
 Lawrence, Kansas
 Mason City, Iowa
 Minneapolis, Minnesota
 Missoula, Montana
 Peoria, Illinois
 Richmond, Virginia
 Sacramento, California
 San Antonio, Texas
 St. Louis, Missouri
 Louisville, Kentucky
 Grand Junction, Colorado
 Omaha, Nebraska

Establishments
 River City (building), a condominium complex in Chicago, Illinois, United States 
 River City Casino, St. Louis, Missouri, United States
 River City Casino (New Orleans), a twin riverboat casino complex which operated for only nine weeks in 1995 in New Orleans, Louisiana, United States
 River City Shopping Complex, a shopping mall in Bangkok, Thailand

Fiction
 River City, a television drama produced by BBC Scotland
 River City (novel), a 2011 novel by Trevor Ferguson
 River City, Iowa, the fictional setting of the live and filmed realizations of the musical The Music Man 
 Kunio-kun video game franchise, typically localized as River City
 River City, the fictional setting of Kunio-kun video games
 River City, the fictional home of the DC Comics hero Odd Man

Other uses
 River City Relay, a famous American football play occurring in 2003
 River City Rhythm Drum and Bugle Corps, an Open Class junior drum and bugle corps from Anoka, Minnesota, United States
 "River City", a multiservice tactical brevity code, an order to implement immediate communications blackout until further notice
 "Rivercity", a song by All That Remains from the album Madness, 2017

River